Cape Hillsborough may refer to:
 Cape Hillsborough, Queensland, a locality in the Mackay Region, Queensland, Australia
 Cape Hillsborough National Park, a national park in the Mackay Region, Queensland, Australia